Amusement parks and theme parks are terms for a group of entertainment attractions, rides, and other events in a location for the enjoyment of large numbers of people. Amusement parks are located all around the world with millions of people visiting them every year. This list of amusement park rankings summarizes the attendance records, park rankings and the results of public polls of amusement parks around the world.

Attendance records
This is a list of annual attendance figures of amusement parks and water parks released by TEA, the Themed Entertainment Association.

Amusement park corporations
This section lists the top 10 largest amusement park corporations in order of annual attendance.

Amusement parks

Worldwide
This section lists the top 25 largest amusement parks worldwide in order of annual attendance.

North America
This section lists the top 20 largest amusement parks in North America in order of annual attendance.

Europe
This section list the top 20 largest amusement parks in Europe in order of annual attendance.

Latin America
This section list the top 10 largest amusement parks in Latin America in order of annual attendance.

Asia-Pacific
This section list the top 20 largest amusement parks in the Asia-Pacific region in order of annual attendance.

Water parks

Worldwide
This section list the top 25 largest water parks worldwide in order of annual attendance.

North America
This section has the top 20 water parks in North America in order of annual attendance.

Latin America
This section has the top 10 water parks in Latin America in order of annual attendance.

Asia-Pacific
This section has the top 15 water parks in Asia-Pacific in order of annual attendance.

Europe / Middle East
This section has the top 10 water parks in Europe / Middle East in order of annual attendance.

Other rankings

Number of roller coasters
This section lists amusement parks with at least 13 currently operating roller coasters.

See also
 List of roller coaster rankings
 List of amusement parks

References